Michael Lehmann (born 16 October 1984 in Kaiserslautern) is a German former footballer. He spent three seasons in the Bundesliga with 1. FC Kaiserslautern.

References

External links
 

1984 births
Living people
German footballers
1. FC Kaiserslautern II players
1. FC Kaiserslautern players
FC Wil players
SV Elversberg players
Bundesliga players
2. Bundesliga players
Association football midfielders